Thirayattam is a ritual performing ethnic art form of the South Malabar region in Kerala state, India. It  blends dance, theatre, music, satire, facial and body painting, masking, martial art and ritualistic function. This vibrant  art form has a great resemblance to the traditions and customs of the ancient civilization. Thirayattam usually enacted in courtyards of "kaavukal" (sacred groves) and village shrines of south Malabar region (kozhikode & malappuram dt:) in Kerala. Traditionally, the "Perumannan" community has the right to perform this magnificent art form in "kaavukal" (sacred Groves). Today, the members of "Panan" and "Cherumar" communities also perform Thirayattam. The performer comes into a trance with "Moorthy" or deity whose "Kolam" is enacted and moves vigorously, exhibiting belligerent mannerism and gestures, believed to be divine.

See also
Theyyam

References

Arts of Kerala
Dance in India
Arts in India